Spexy Beast is a stand-up comedy tour performed by British comedian Alan Carr. The tour was Carr's first to be performed in arena type venues, with extra dates being added in most territories due to popular demand.

Show incidents
During one of the shows in Brighton a female member of the audience, who was pregnant went into labour from laughing so much.
Tessa Lawson was watching the comic’s new Spexy Beast show when she felt the baby move and rushed to the toilet just before the interval.
When her waters broke, she was rushed to hospital and gave birth to a healthy girl later that evening. Carr later commented on the incident via Twitter stating,

Tour dates

References

2010s in comedy